Liang Jun (born 12 March 1969) is a Chinese fencer. She competed at the 1992 and 1996 Summer Olympics.

References

1969 births
Living people
Chinese female fencers
Olympic fencers of China
Fencers at the 1992 Summer Olympics
Fencers at the 1996 Summer Olympics
Asian Games medalists in fencing
Fencers at the 1990 Asian Games
Fencers at the 1994 Asian Games
Asian Games gold medalists for China
Medalists at the 1990 Asian Games
Medalists at the 1994 Asian Games
20th-century Chinese women